Herman Pfisterer (April 1, 1866 – August 6, 1905) was a musician serving in the United States Army during the Spanish–American War who received the Medal of Honor for bravery.

Biography
Pfisterer was born April 1, 1866, in Brooklyn, New York and joined the army from New York City in January 1886. He was sent to the Spanish–American War with Company H, 21st U.S. Infantry as a musician where he received the Medal of Honor for assisting in the rescue of wounded while under heavy enemy fire.

Pfisterer died on August 6, 1905, and is buried in Fort Vancouver Military Cemetery, Vancouver, Washington.

In 1991 the Congressional Medal of Honor Society erected a monument in Washington State and presented it to the city of Vancouver, Washington that includes Herman Pfisterer's name as well as three other Medal of Honor recipients buried there.

Medal of Honor citation
Rank and organization: Musician, Company H, 21st U.S. Infantry. Place and date: At Santiago, Cuba, 1 July 1898. Entered service at New York, N.Y. Birth: Brooklyn, N.Y. Date of issue: 22 June 1899

Citation:

Gallantly assisted in the rescue of the wounded from in front of the lines and under heavy fire from the enemy.

See also

List of Medal of Honor recipients for the Spanish–American War

References

External links

1866 births
1905 deaths
United States Army Medal of Honor recipients
United States Army soldiers
American military personnel of the Spanish–American War
People from Brooklyn
Spanish–American War recipients of the Medal of Honor